|}

The Gerry Feilden Hurdle is a Premier Handicap National Hunt hurdle race in Great Britain which is open to horses aged four years or older. It is run at Newbury over a distance of about 2 miles and half a furlong (2 miles and 69 yards, or 3,282 metres), and it is scheduled to take place each year in late November or early December at the course's Ladbrokes Trophy meeting.

It is currently an Intermediate Hurdle (Limited Handicap) sponsored by Ladbrokes Coral, but in the 1980s and early 1990s it was a Grade 2 race, contested by many of the top hurdlers. It was given Grade 2 status when the National Hunt Pattern was revised in 1989 and was restricted to horses in their second winning season (intermediates) over hurdles – the 1992 running, for example, was restricted to horses which had not won prior to 2 August 1991. Similar conditions still apply – the 2019 running was restricted to horses which had not won before 29 April 2019. The race was subsequently reduced to Listed status and was re-classified as a Premier Handicap from the 2022 running when Listed status was removed from handicap races.

The race was first run in 1954, and is named in honour of General Sir Randle (Gerry) Feilden, one of the great post-war racing administrators.

Winners

See also
 Horse racing in Great Britain
 List of British National Hunt races

References

Racing Post:
,, 

National Hunt hurdle races
National Hunt races in Great Britain
Newbury Racecourse